Elections for the City of Edinburgh Council took place on Thursday 6 April 1995, alongside elections to the various newly created unitary councils across Scotland.

Labour won 34 of the council's 58 seats, continuing their control of the council.

Aggregate results

References

1995
1995 Scottish local elections
1990s in Edinburgh